Fernando José Pacheco Rivas (born 26 June 1999) is a Peruvian professional footballer who plays for Deportivo Municipal on loan from Sporting Cristal, as a winger.

Club career

Sporting Cristal
Born in Bujama Baja, Mala, Cañete, Pacheco joined Sporting Cristal's youth setup at the age of 14. He made his first team debut on 20 August 2016 at the age of just 17, starting in a 1–0 home win against Unión Comercio.

Pacheco scored his first professional goal on 3 March 2018, in a 5–0 routing of Universidad San Martín de Porres.

Fluminense
On 13 January 2020, Pacheco moved abroad and signed a four-year contract with Campeonato Brasileiro Série A side Fluminense.

Emmen
On 4 July 2022, Pacheco joined Emmen in the Netherlands on a season-long loan.

Honours
Sporting Cristal
 Peruvian Primera División: 2016, 2018

References

External links

1999 births
Living people
Peruvian footballers
Peru under-20 international footballers
Association football wingers
Sporting Cristal footballers
Fluminense FC players
Esporte Clube Juventude players
FC Emmen players
Peruvian Primera División players
Campeonato Brasileiro Série A players
Eredivisie players
Peruvian expatriate footballers
Peruvian expatriate sportspeople in Brazil
Expatriate footballers in Brazil
Peruvian expatriate sportspeople in the Netherlands
Expatriate footballers in the Netherlands